Laurence or Lawrence Godfrey may refer to:

 Laurence Godfrey (physics lecturer) (born 1952), physicist, expert evidence in Internet-related litigation and litigant in Godfrey v. Demon
 Larry Godfrey (Laurence Paul Godfrey, born 1976), Olympic archer
Lawrence Godfrey (Shortland Street)